This is a list of people who have served as Lord Lieutenant of Limerick.

There were lieutenants of counties in Ireland until the reign of James II, when they were renamed governors. The office of Lord Lieutenant was recreated on 23 August 1831. The title Lord Lieutenant was always pronounced as 'Lord Lef-tenant'.

Governors

 William Bourke, 8th Baron Bourke of Connell: 1689–1691 (died 1691)
 Thomas Southwell, 1st Viscount Southwell: 1762– (died 1780)
 The Lord Muskerry: 1780–1818
 The Hon. Richard Hobart FitzGibbon: 1818–1831

Lord Lieutenants
 The Hon. Richard Hobart FitzGibbon (who later became, in 1851, 3rd Earl of Clare): 7 October 1831 – September 1848
 The 2nd Earl of Clare: 13 September 1848 – 13 August 1851
 The 3rd Earl of Clare: 1851 – 10 January 1864
 The 3rd Earl of Dunraven and Mount-Earl: 20 February 1864 – 6 October 1871 
 The 1st Baron Emly: 8 December 1871 – 20 April 1894
 Thomas Enraght O'Brien: 29 November 1894 – 18 January 1896
 The 4th Earl of Dunraven and Mount-Earl: 5 March 1896 – 1922

References

Limerick